The LTI TX1 is a Hackney carriage (London "Black cab") introduced by London Taxis International in 1997 and designed to replace the ageing Austin FX4. It was designed by British product designer Kenneth Grange.

Most are powered by a diesel engine from Nissan, a relationship which began in late FX4s.  In 2002 it was replaced by the TXII, which used the Ford Duratorq engine as found in the Ford Transit, Mondeo, and Land Rover Defender.

Unlike modernistic van-shaped experimental cabs, the body was designed to recall several distinctive styling cues of the FX4. Upon completion, it was submitted to cab drivers for their approval and won their acceptance as sufficiently maintaining the spirit of the London cab.

The improved interior has allowed certain after-market additions to be made to vehicles such as the Cabvision technology.

References

External links 

TX1
2000s cars
Front-wheel-drive vehicles
Retro-style automobiles
Taxis of the United Kingdom
Taxi vehicles
Cars introduced in 1997